Jinjiawan Station is a station on Line 2 of Chongqing Rail Transit in Chongqing municipality, China. It is located in Dadukou District and opened in 2014.

Station structure

References

Railway stations in Chongqing
Railway stations in China opened in 2014
Chongqing Rail Transit stations